{{DISPLAYTITLE:C20H27NO3}}
The molecular formula C20H27NO3 (molar mass: 329.433 g/mol) may refer to:

 A-77636, a selective dopamine receptor D1 agonist
 2C-E-NBOMe, a designer drug
 25G-NBOMe
 Trilostane, an inhibitor of 3 β-hydroxysteroid dehydrogenase used in the treatment of Cushing's syndrome
 Son Goku, a fictional anime character in the well known series Dragon Ball Z